Jane Martha St. John (née Hicks Beach, 1801–1882) was an early English photographer. She is remembered for her calotypes of Rome and other towns in Italy, now in the J. Paul Getty Museum and the Metropolitan Museum of Art.

St. John made over 100 photographs in the late 1850s when travelling with her husband in Italy. Her introduction to photography probably resulted from the connections her privileged family enjoyed with John Dillwyn Llewelyn and the pioneering Talbots. St. John's work included portraits, travel views, and scenes of the grounds of houses. The photographs of the Hotel des Étrangers in Naples and the view of the waterfront are remarkable for the period. Unlike her contemporaries, she was interested above all in capturing the scenes of her travels but her images were also carefully composed. This is particularly evident in her photograph of the Roman Colosseum with the adjacent Arch of Constantine. Her individual approach to her work makes St. John one of the more interesting amateur photographers of the mid-19th century.

Biography

Jane Martha St. John was born Jane Martha Hicks Beach (not as has been mistakenly reported Jane Martha Beach) on 24 July 1801 at Williamstrip Park, Coln St. Aldwyn, Gloucestershire. She was the fourth daughter of Michael Hicks (Beach, 1760–1830) and Henrietta Maria Beach (1760–1837). The family was particularly wealthy as her mother inherited large estates in Wiltshire as well as Williamstrip in Gloucestershire. In his will, Henrietta Maria Beach's father had stipulated that Michael should take the Beach name. As a result, in 1790 the name "Hicks Beach" came into being by Royal Licence.

By the time Jane Martha was nine, her three sisters and two of her brothers had died. Her brother Michael, 21 years her senior had married, and her brother William, 18 years older than his sister, having completed his education at Eton and Edinburgh, the latter with his tutor Sydney Smith, was MP for Marlborough, leaving her as the only child at home. As her father was MP for Cirencester as well as a large landowner, the child's main occupation was probably to act as a companion to her mother.

When Jane Martha was 14, her brother Michael died of sunstroke while on holiday, leaving her mother with a daughter-in-law she apparently disliked. Jane Martha became protective of her mother as can be seen in her correspondence to her sister-in-law at the time, tactfully suggesting that she stay away from Williamstrip.

In 1832, their uncle, Wither Bramston, died, leaving his Oakley Hall estate in Hampshire to Jane Martha's brother William who went to live there with his young family. Jane may have joined him immediately or after their mother died in 1837. At that point, she had certainly moved to Oakley to keep house for her brother and help look after his children. There is also documentary evidence that Jane Martha Hicks Beach, as she then was, received correspondence addressed to her at Oakley but for the attention of her brother. In 1844/45 William, with Jane Martha and the children, took an extended holiday in Germany, possibly inspiring her to take her later trip to Italy.

Jane Martha became acquainted with Edward William St. John, the only son of the Rev. Edward St. John and his wife Mary from the adjacent Ashe Park estate. 
On 24 February 1848, Jane Martha, then 47, and Edward were married at the Hicks Beach family seat of Williamstrip. Her devotion to Edward, 14 years her junior, can be seen from all the photographs of him she included in her album. It was probably in 1848 that her brother William installed them in Oakley Cottage on his estate, but understandably he saw no need for a written agreement with his sister. It was only after his death on 22 November 1856 that a lease from his son, William Wither Bramston Beach, was signed with Edward St. John.

In the intervening years cousin Emma Thomasina Talbot sent Jane copies of family photos taken by her husband, the pioneering photographer John Dillwyn Llewelyn (later included in Jane's family album). Emma had herself taken a keen interest in photography from the beginning and assisted her husband by printing for him.

When Jane Martha St. John finally acquired a camera of her own some time in the 1850s, she sent her photos to friends and family. Some can be seen in the album of her cousin Emma Thomasina's daughter, Emma Charlotte (1837–1929), now in the Metropolitan Museum of Art. It was not until the late 1850s that Jane made a family album of her own which she used for the photos she received from others as well as those she took herself.
  
In the late 1850s Jane and Edward had set off equipped with a camera and sensitised paper on a journey through France to Italy, where more than one hundred times she positioned her camera to record the scenes that she liked most, to be dwelt upon when she got home.  Her album of that tour containing one hundred and six of these Italian views is now in the J. Paul Getty Museum.

Early interest in photography

St. John seems to have turned to neither her distant cousin Henry Fox Talbot nor her Welsh cousin Emma Thomasina's husband, John Dillwyn Llewelyn for help getting started in photography. She seems to have had no contact with Talbot after he was taken to Williamstrip when he was fifteen.  As for Llewellyn, no photos of Jane Martha at Penllergare have come to light.  Neither are there any of Llewellyn at Oakley Cottage in Jane's album, and surely she wouldn't have missed the opportunity. Llewellyn's wife and Jane's cousin, Emma Thomasina, did visit her around 1865, a visit recorded in the album, and we know that Jane kept in contact with her cousins in Glamorgan and that photography was sometimes the subject, but there is no evidence of her asking for advice.  Her album seems to give us the reason; it tells us that she had acquired a mentor of her own.

In an album that was almost totally reserved for her and Edward's family she places a complete outsider, Peter Wickens Fry, on page 1, ahead of everyone, even before the portrait of the children that she helped to bring up. Fry seems to have given her the help that she would have needed before heading off on a journey to Italy (one he had already made) reasonably confident that she would return with what she wanted.  Also that it was probably Fry who guided her in the collodion process that she used in the years to follow.

Fry might have been introduced to Jane by the Llewelyn's, or perhaps by her brother William who could have come to know him when visiting his relatives or his one-time ward in Glamorgan, and perhaps Fry came to Oakley Hall some time. There are many possibilities; so far we don't know how they were introduced but from the wealth of family documents in the Gloucestershire Archive it may be explained in the future.

In a family that had experienced so many premature deaths Jane was the exception and died at Oakley on 18 November 1882 at 81. Her husband Edward St. John died four years later on 18 April 1886.

Relationship with the Talbot family

John Ivory Talbot 1687–1772 of Lacock Abbey, Wiltshire, married the Hon. Mary Mansel 1696–1735 the daughter of Thomas, 1st Lord Mansel of Margam, Glamorgan. They had three children, John, Thomas and Martha Talbot. 
 
John 1717–1778 would inherit Lacock and marry Elizabeth Stone in 1742, but left no issue.
Thomas 1719–1758 would inherit Margam and Penrice and marry Jane Beach 1726–1768 daughter of Thomas Beach 1684–1753 of Netheravon and Keevil. Their son, Thomas Mansel Talbot 1747–1813 married in 1794 Mary Lucy Fox Strangways, the second daughter of Henry Thomas Fox Strangways, 2nd Earl of Ilchester. From this union came the Mansel Talbot line and a large family; Christopher "Kit" Rice Mansel Talbot and his six sisters, one of whom would marry John Dillwyn Llewelyn.
Martha ?–1790 married William Davenport 1725–1781, and their son, William Davenport Talbot 1763–1800, inherited Lacock from his uncle John in 1772, and married in 1776 Elizabeth Theresa Fox Strangways, the sister of Mary Lucy, and the first daughter of the 2nd Earl of Ilchester. They had one son, Henry Fox Talbot.
William Beach 1719–1790, son of Thomas Beach and the brother of Jane Beach, married Anne Wither 1718–1788 of Hall Place (later Oakley Hall), Oakley, Hampshire. Their daughter Henrietta Maria Beach 1760–1837 would marry Michael Hicks 1760–1830, and on the death of her father in 1790 create the Hicks Beach family line. They were the parents of our photographer Jane Martha St. John, née Hicks Beach.

Jane Martha St. John's family album
In 1992 an album of photographs was sold at an auction of furniture and chattels at Williamstrip Park, Gloucestershire. The album would turn out to be the personal family album of Jane Martha St. John, and has helped to fill in the many gaps in her biography.

A green Morocco bound album with a single gold tooled line to its edge with pages that are watermarked JOYNSON 1854 and measure approximately 225×197mm there are 96 photos arranged on 87 pages that are hand numbered 1 to 90 but with pages 23 and 40 missing (one is possibly in the Swansea Museum collection) and page 90 is unused.

The earliest are well known photos by John Dillwyn Llewelyn, dating from 1853; these were probably printed and sent to St. John by her cousin Emma Thomasina Talbot. Two others in a group of five taken at Williamstrip Park are dated by hand "May 1861" indicating they were taken around the time of the marriage of Caroline Julia Hicks Beach, her brother Michael's granddaughter, to John Talbot Dillwyn Llewelyn on 7 May 1861. It is not known if St. John took these five photos but she must surely have been in attendance at the family home on the occasion of her grandniece's marriage to her cousin Emma's first son, so it is most likely that she did.

There are a few formal portraits that are almost certainly not by St. John. The rest, mainly taken by St. John in the grounds of her home and perhaps a few in the locality, as well as those taken at Williamstrip Park, seem to date from between 1859 and 1866. In view of their similarity with the buildings today, 68 of the photos were clearly taken in the grounds of what used to be called by the family Oakley Cottage, now Oakley Manor, the home of Jane and Edward St. John.

The album was probably kept at Oakley Hall in Hampshire after the death of Edward St. John until 1931 when William Guy Hicks Beach (1891–1953), the great-grandson of Jane's brother, William, was declared bankrupt and the Oakley estate in total, inherited from his father Archibald seven years before, was sold to a speculator who promptly held sales of the contents. The family were given no notice but were able to buy some items back and it was probably then that the album came back to Jane's birthplace of Williamstrip Park in Gloucestershire, which is where it was found in 1992.

Someone in the family has tried to put names to some of the faces and record them in the album.  From the titles and the formality of the names it is clear that this took place in the 20th century, possibly in the 1930s.

Children and animals

Jane had no children of her own but she was aunt to many.  Across both the English and Welsh sides of the family and during her long life, she became known as 'Aunt Jane St. John', presumably to separate her from any other Aunt Jane in this very large family.  She also enjoyed the challenge of photographing the children of her nieces and nephews as can be seen in her album.

From her family photos it is clear that Jane loved animals.  Ponies, dogs (many of them), a goat, and a parrot called Polly, all seem to be part of the household and not just welcome to be in her photos but one would guess as important as the humans were to Jane, particularly Peter the dog who is almost always present.

Published work on Jane Martha St. John

In Impressed by Light: British Photographers from Paper Negatives, 1840–1860, published in 2007 by the Metropolitan Museum of Art (New York), Roger Taylor writes at the end of his article on St. John, "Although she is unlikely ever to be considered a great photographer, St. John was certainly one of the more interesting amateurs of the mid-nineteenth century, not only because she was a woman but because her attitude toward picture making and photography was highly original." The article is accompanied by 12 plates from St. John's album of Italian views.

Permanent collections
Metropolitan Museum of Art (New York City)
J. Paul Getty Museum (California)
Swansea Museum

Notes

References

Further reading
Beach, Susan Hicks (1909). A Cotswold Family: Hicks and Hicks Beach, Heineman.

External links
    
 Jane Martha St. John biography in Luminous-Lint

English women photographers
1801 births
1882 deaths
19th-century English photographers
19th-century British women artists
Photographers from Gloucestershire
19th-century women photographers
19th-century English women